Cross Plains is an unincorporated community in Brown Township, Ripley County, in the U.S. state of Indiana.

History
Cross Plains was founded in 1826 and was named for the fact two roads meet at the town site. A post office has been in operation at Cross Plains since 1826.

Geography

References

Unincorporated communities in Ripley County, Indiana
Unincorporated communities in Indiana